The 1967 Lehigh Engineers football team was an American football team that represented Lehigh University during the 1967 NCAA College Division football season. Lehigh finished last in both the Middle Atlantic Conference, University Division, and the Middle Three Conference.

In their third year under head coach Fred Dunlap, the Engineers compiled a 1–8 record. Rich Miller was the team captain.

In conference play, Lehigh's winless (0–4) record against opponents in the MAC University Division represented the worst winning percentage among the seven teams competing for the division title. An eighth team, is listed below Lehigh in the standings tables because it was a division member but played no division games.

Lehigh also lost both games to its Middle Three rivals, Lafayette and Rutgers, for a last-place finish in that conference.

Lehigh played its home games at Taylor Stadium on the university campus in Bethlehem, Pennsylvania.

Schedule

References

Lehigh
Lehigh
Lehigh Mountain Hawks football seasons
Lehigh Engineers football